Liptena sauberi is a butterfly in the family Lycaenidae. It is found in Cameroon and possibly Nigeria.

See also
 List of butterflies of Nigeria

References

External links

Die Gross-Schmetterlinge der Erde 13: Die Afrikanischen Tagfalter. Plate XIII 65 c

Butterflies described in 1912
Liptena